According to one study Atheist constituted 18.8% of those who participated in the 2019 study, which was conducted by a government-affiliated think tank, However another 2019 CRA study shows that 92.8 percent of the population self-identified as religious.

See also 
 Religion in Kazakhstan
 Freedom of religion in Kazakhstan
 Christianity in Kazakhstan
 Islam in Kazakhstan
 Demographics of Kazakhstan

References 

Religion in Kazakhstan
Kazakhstan